The 1982 World Karate Championships are the 6th edition of the World Karate Championships, and were held in Taipei, Taiwan from November 21 to 25 November 1982.

Medalists

Men

Women

Medal table

See also
 List of sporting events in Taiwan

References

External links
 World Karate Federation
 Results
 Report

World Karate Championships
1982 in Taiwanese sport
World Karate Championships
International sports competitions hosted by Taiwan
Karate Championships
Karate competitions in Taiwan
20th century in Taipei
November 1982 sports events in Asia